Lehsen is a village and a former municipality in the Ludwigslust-Parchim district, in Mecklenburg-Vorpommern, Germany. Since 25 May 2014, it is part of the town Wittenburg.

References

Ludwigslust-Parchim
Former municipalities in Mecklenburg-Western Pomerania